Two major human polls made up the 2022 NCAA Division I women's soccer rankings: United Soccer Coaches and Top Drawer Soccer.

Legend

United Soccer Coaches 

Source:

Top Drawer Soccer 

Source:

References

Rankings
College women's soccer rankings in the United States